Leonard Joseph Johnson (18 March 1919 – 20 April 1977) was an Australian cricketer who played in one Test match in 1948.

Cricket career
Johnson gained recognition representing Queensland in the "Sheffield Shield" competition for Australian troops at Bougainville, in the Solomons, at the end of World War II. He played for Queensland from 1946–47 to 1952–53.

He toured New Zealand with an Australian second XI in 1950, but despite his talent he only played one Test: against India at Melbourne in the final Test of the 1947–48 series. He scored 25 not out and took 3 for 66 and 3 for 8. Earlier in the season he had taken seven wickets in Queensland's victory over the Indian team. It is thought that Sam Loxton won preference over him in selection for the 1948 tour of England.

He achieved his best bowling figures of 7 for 43 twice: against New South Wales in 1949–50, and against Western Australia in 1951–52. He ended his playing career with a tally of 171 wickets in 43 Shield matches for Queensland, a state record until it was overtaken by Ross Duncan and Peter Allan.

References

External links

1919 births
1977 deaths
Australia Test cricketers
Queensland cricketers
Sportspeople from Ipswich, Queensland
Cricketers from Queensland